Stull may refer to:

Stull, Kansas, an unincorporated community in USA
Stull, Pennsylvania, a populated place in Wyoming County, Pennsylvania in USA
Stull (surname), people with the surname
31113 Stull, an asteroid
Stull (EP), an extended play by Urge Overkill

See also
Stull Observatory, an observatory at Alfred University in the United States
Stull stoping, a mining method